University is a neighborhood within the greater University community in Minneapolis, Minnesota. It is almost completely occupied by the Minneapolis campus of the University of Minnesota, hence the name. The Mississippi River divides it into two, making it the only official neighborhood in Minneapolis that occupies both sides of the river. On the west bank, the neighborhood is bound by 1st Street on the north, 19th Avenue on the west, 4th Street on the south, and the river to the east. On the east bank, it is bound by the river to the west and south and Oak Street to the east; the northern boundary, going from west to east, is along 11th Avenue, University Avenue, 15th Avenue, and the railroad tracks near 8th Street.

References

External links
Minneapolis Neighborhood Profile - University

Neighborhoods in Minneapolis
Minnesota populated places on the Mississippi River